Ethallobarbital (brand names Dormin, Dumex, Dormitiv, Dorval), also known as ethallymal and 5-allyl-5-ethylbarbituric acid, is an allyl-substituted barbiturate described as a sedative/hypnotic. It was first synthesized in 1927.

See also
 Allobarbital

References

Allyl compounds
Barbiturates
GABAA receptor positive allosteric modulators
Hypnotics
Sedatives
Substances discovered in the 1920s